Francis Patrick Shea (October 29, 1911 – December 16, 1978) was a professional ice hockey defenseman. He played ten games in the National Hockey League with the Chicago Black Hawks during the 1931–32 season. He was born in Potlatch, Idaho but grew up in White Bear Lake, Minnesota.

External links

1911 births
1978 deaths
American men's ice hockey defensemen
Chicago Blackhawks players
Ice hockey people from Minnesota
Kansas City Greyhounds players
Minneapolis Millers (AHA) players
Minneapolis Millers (CHL) players
People from White Bear Lake, Minnesota
Pittsburgh Yellow Jackets (IHL) players
St. Paul Greyhounds players
Tulsa Oilers (AHA) players